The Dutch Shoe Mystery is a novel which was written in 1931 by Ellery Queen.  It is the third of the Ellery Queen mysteries.

Plot summary

An eccentric millionairess is lying in a diabetic coma on a hospital bed in an anteroom of the surgical suite of the Dutch Memorial Hospital, which she founded, awaiting the removal of her gall bladder.  When the surgery is about to begin, the patient is found to have been strangled with picture wire.  Although the hospital is crowded, it is well guarded, and only a limited number of people had the opportunity to have murdered her, including members of her family and a small number of the medical personnel.

The apparent murderer is a member of the surgical staff who was actually seen in the victim's vicinity, but his limp makes him easy to impersonate.  Ellery Queen examines a pair of hospital shoes, one of which has a broken lace that has been mended with surgical tape.  He performs an extended piece of logical deduction based on the shoe, plus such slight clues as the position of a filing cabinet, and creates a list of necessary characteristics of the murderer that narrows the field of suspects down to a single surprising possibility.

Literary significance & criticism
(See Ellery Queen.)  The character of Ellery Queen and the more-or-less locked room mystery format were probably suggested by the novels featuring detective Philo Vance by S.S. Van Dine, which were very popular at the time.  This novel was the third in a long series of novels featuring Ellery Queen, the first nine containing a nationality in the title.

The introduction to this novel contained some details which are now not considered part of the Ellery Queen canon.  For instance, the introduction is written as by the anonymous "J.J. McC.", a friend of the Queens, and speaks of Ellery's marriage and child, and their life in Italy, and that the names of both Ellery Queen and his father are pseudonyms—none of these circumstances survived for long.  It also mentions a novel called Murder of the Marionettes (page 184 of the Signet paperback edition in Chapter 27) which purports to have been written by the detective Ellery Queen, not the writer of the Ellery Queen novels themselves; this novel does not exist and is not mentioned again.

The novel, and the other "nationality" mysteries, had the unusual feature of a "Challenge to the Reader" just before the ending is revealed—the novel breaks the fourth wall and speaks directly to the reader.  "At this point in the story of The Dutch Shoe Mystery ... I inject a Challenge to the Reader ... maintaining with perfect sincerity that the reader is now in possession of all the pertinent facts essential to the correct solution of the ... murders."

"In spite of great length and unnecessary imitation of Van Dine, a well-reasoned solution of an attractive problem."

External links 
"Ellery Queen is the American detective story."
The Dutch Shoe Mystery (1931), "Reading Ellery Queen" (blog)

References

1931 American novels
Novels by Ellery Queen
Novels set in hospitals
Frederick A. Stokes Company books